Escuela Waterpolo Zaragoza, also known simply as EWZ, is a Spanish water polo club from Zaragoza established in 1984. It is best known for its women's team, which has played in the División de Honor Femenina since 2004. It has also played the LEN Trophy.

References

External links
Official website

Water polo clubs in Spain
Sport in Zaragoza
Sports clubs established in 1984
Sports teams in Aragon